Arkansas Highway 223 (AR 223, Hwy. 223) is a north–south state highway in north Arkansas. The route of  runs from Highway 56 in Calico Rock north across US Route 62/US Route 412 (US 62/US 412) to Missouri Supplemental Route E (SSR-E) at the Missouri state line.

Route description

AR 223 begins in Calico Rock at Highway 56. The route runs north to meet the southern terminus of Highway 177 in Pineville. The route continues north to meet US 62/US 412 in Viola in Fulton County, after which it continues north to the Missouri state line where the route extends as Missouri supplemental route E.

Major intersections

See also

References

223
Transportation in Fulton County, Arkansas
Transportation in Izard County, Arkansas